The 57th Infantry Division was a German division in World War II. It was formed on 26 August 1939 in Landshut.

History
The 57th Infantry Division was formed in August 1939 as part of the second wave of German infantry divisions. During the German-Soviet invasion of Poland, the division remained in the Saarland.

The division was moved into Poland as an occupational force in August 1940 until the initiation of Operation Barbarossa in June 1941. The division took part in the campaign as part of Army Group South, where it assaulted Kiev.

Orders of Battle

1939
179th Infantry Regiment
199th Infantry Regiment
217th Infantry Regiment
157th Artillery Regiment
157th Engineer Battalion
157th Reconnaissance Battalion
157th Anti-tank Detachment
News department
157th Troops supply

1944
164th Grenadier Regiment
199th Grenadier Regiment
217th Grenadier Regiment
57th Fusilier Battalion
157th Artillery Regiment
157th Field-replacement Battalion
157th Engineer Battalion
157th Anti-tank detachment
News department
157th Troops supply

Commanding officers
Generalleutnant Oskar Blümm, 1 September 1939 – 26 September 1941
General der Infanterie Anton Dostler, 26 September 1941 – 10 April 1942
Generalleutnant Oskar Blümm, 10 April 1942 – 10 October 1942
General der Infanterie Friedrich Siebert, 10 October 1942 – 20 February 1943
Generalleutnant Otto Fretter-Pico, 20 February 1943 – 1 September 1943
Generalleutnant Vincenz Müller, 1 September 1943 – 19 September 1943
Generalmajor Adolf Trowitz, 19 September 1943 – 7 July 1944

External links

0*057
Military units and formations established in 1939
Military units and formations disestablished in 1944
1939 establishments in Germany